The 1999 Country Music Association Awards, 33rd Ceremony, was held on September 22, 1999 at the Grand Ole Opry House, Nashville, Tennessee, and was hosted by CMA Award Winner, Vince Gill.

Faith Hill lead the night with 7 nominations, including Album of the Year, and Entertainer of the Year

Winners and Nominees 
Winner are in Bold.

Hall Of Fame

References 

Country Music Association
CMA
Country Music Association Awards
Country Music Association Awards
Country Music Association Awards
Country Music Association Awards
20th century in Nashville, Tennessee
Events in Nashville, Tennessee